Like Water is the debut extended play by South Korean singer Wendy. The EP was released on April 5, 2021, by SM Entertainment and consists of five tracks, including the two title tracks, "When This Rain Stops" and "Like Water". The EP makes Wendy the first Red Velvet member to make a solo debut.

Background
News of the EP was first reported on March 10 by South Korean entertainment outlet StarNews. The publication had claimed that Wendy was working on a solo album planned for release in April. Shortly after the report, SM confirmed that the singer would release a solo project sometime next month, although a specific date had not been announced at the time. "Wendy is working with the goal of releasing a solo album in April. Please look forward to it," the company stated. Prior to the EP's release, Wendy had been on a year-long hiatus due to a stage accident during the 2019 SBS Gayo Daejeon music festival. She suffered a pelvic fracture and broken wrist, among other injuries, and had to be hospitalized for two months.

The official music video teaser for the title track was released on YouTube and Naver TV via SM Entertainment's official channels at midnight on April 2. A second teaser was released the next day, which features Wendy looking glowing as she is bathed in sunset like glow, in this amber-colored teaser. She is surrounded by water droplets and fresh flowers and a heavenly instrumental sound fills the background. Towards the end, Wendy hits the high-notes, standing in a red dress.The video was released alongside the song on April 5 and features Wendy performing the song alone in a mansion filled with overgrown plants. It also features shots of the singer in a glass pavilion, similarly surrounded by bright red flora.

Composition
The EP contains five tracks. "Like Water" is described as an acoustic pop ballad characterized by Wendy's pure vocals. Written by prominent South Korean songwriters Kenzie and Yoo Young-jin, the song offers Wendy's deepest epiphanies as she reflects on her blessings from those who've been by her side at every step of life. The gentle mix of guitar and band sounds in the song keep the rhythm ebullient before she wraps up with a soothing outro and reinforces the chorus with her signature high-notes.

"When This Rain Stops" is a piano ballad that sends a message of empathy and strength. The song is backed with a slight yet steady piano melody combined with Wendy's dynamic vocals. There is very little scope for her to rest throughout the song which delivers a sense of urgency to the narrative. The lyrics seem heavily influenced by her own personal experience in the past year when she struggled with recovery in an atmosphere of uncertainty. "Why Can't You Love Me?" is a cheerful spring inspired track about a one sided love. "The Road" is a modern rock song. "Best Friend" features fellow Red Velvet bandmate Seulgi and explores various genres ranging from pop to rock.

Track listing

Charts

Weekly charts

Monthly charts

Year-end charts

Release history

References

2021 debut EPs
Korean-language EPs
SM Entertainment EPs